The Terror State is the fifth studio album by Pittsburgh punk rock band Anti-Flag, released on October 21, 2003, on Fat Wreck Chords.  The album's artwork was regarded as somewhat controversial (picturing lead vocalist Justin Sane's niece, Rachel, amongst rubble and holding an automatic handgun), and the band was forced to create an alternate version (which was simply all black with the Terror State logo centered) for sale in some larger chain stores, such as Wal-Mart.

On the inside of the cardboard sleeve surrounding the CD case there is a stencil print of GW Bush with text stating "one term President".

Produced by Tom Morello, The Terror State was hailed as Anti-Flag's most polished album to date.  The album made #1 on KTUH's charts on the week of January 19, 2004. As of April 3, 2008, the album had sold 106,000 copies.

Track listing

Personnel
 Justin Sane - guitar, lead vocals on tracks 1, 2, 4, 6, 8, 10, 12, 14
 Chris Head - guitar, backing vocals
 Chris #2 - bass guitar, lead vocals on tracks 3, 5, 7, 9, 11, 13, 14
 Pat Thetic - drums

Charts

References

2003 albums
Anti-Flag albums
Fat Wreck Chords albums